Phase II is the second studio album by American singer Prince Royce; it was released on April 10, 2012, by Top Stop Music. The 12-track album (with two acoustic bonus tracks) saw Royce incorporate a variety of music styles to his work, including bachata, Latin pop, R&B and mariachi. Phase II contains songs in both English and Spanish, with melodies atypical to traditional bachata music, which had been regarded as Royce's main music genre since the release of his eponymous debut studio album in 2010.

Three singles were released to promote the album in 2012. In the United States, the album's lead single, "Las Cosas Pequeñas" debuted at number one on the Billboard Tropical Songs chart, and eventually also reached number one on the Billboard Hot Latin Songs chart. The album's second and third singles, "Incondicional" and "Te Me Vas", both peaked at number two on the US Hot Latin Songs chart.

Phase II was certified Platinum (Latin field) in the US by the Recording Industry Association of America (RIAA) just six months after its release. It was later nominated for Best Tropical Fusion Album at the Latin Grammy Awards of 2012, Royce's third Latin Grammy nomination.

Track listing

The deluxe edition included the CD containing the first 13 tracks from the album and an exclusive bonus DVD featuring 6 live performances, 2 music videos and up-close interviews (in English & Spanish).

Charts

Weekly charts

Year-end charts

Album certification

See also
List of number-one Billboard Latin Albums from the 2010s

References

2012 albums
Prince Royce albums
Spanish-language albums
Top Stop Music albums